Kekur is a rural locality (a village) in Stepanovskoye Rural Settlement, Kudymkarsky District, Perm Krai, Russia. The population was 355 as of 2010.

Geography 
It is located 8 km south from Kudymkar.

References 

Rural localities in Kudymkarsky District